The Comptes rendus des scéances de l'Académie des Inscriptions et Belles-Lettres is an academic journal of history, philology, and archeology published by the Académie des Inscriptions et Belles-Lettres. It publishes articles in these fields as well as information on the life of the Academy and its various sessions.

History
The origin of the journal goes back to an initiative by Ernest Desjardins, a member of the Academy, who decided in 1857 to publish the sessions of the Académie des Inscriptions et Belles-Lettres of the year. In a decision of 26 May 1865, the Academy took charge of the publication and entrusted his permanent secretary with its care. The publication was first weekly and since 1970, quarterly.

Issues are partly available (from 1900 to 2005) free of charge on the Persée portal.

External links 
Journal page on Academy website
Comptes rendus des scéances de l'Académie des Inscriptions et Belles-Lettres on Persée

History journals
Publications established in 1857
French-language journals
Quarterly journals
1857 establishments in France